Fabiola a Spanish and mostly Italian diminutive of the name Fabia, may refer to:

People
 Queen Fabiola of Belgium (1928-2014)
 Saint Fabiola, (fl. 395–399)
 Fabiola Letelier (born 1929), Chilean lawyer, human rights activist
 Fabiola Gianotti (born 1962), Italian particle physicist 
 Fabiola Zuluaga (born 1979), Colombian tennis player
 Fabiola Yáñez (born 1981), first lady of Argentina
 Fabiola Campillai (born 1983), Chilean senator-elect
 Anita Fabiola (born 1994), Ugandan TV Host and Model
 Fabiola Rodas (born 1993), Guatemalan singer songwriter
 Fabiola De Clercq (born 1950), Belgian-Italian writer

Culture
 Fabiola (1918 film), a silent Italian film
 Fabiola (1949 film), a film known in English as The Fighting Gladiator
 Fabiola (novel), an 1854 novel by Cardinal Nicholas Wiseman

Other
 Fabiola (moth), a concealer moth genus in subfamily Oecophorinae
 MSC Fabiola, a container ship
 1576 Fabiola, Themistian asteroid 
 Queen Fabiola Mountains